The 1989-90 Welsh Cup winners were Hereford United. The final was played at the National Stadium in Cardiff in front of an attendance of 4,182.

Semi-finals – first leg

Semi-finals – second leg

Final

External links
Details of final

1989-90
Wales
Cup